Jordan Hill may refer to:

 Jordan Hill (singer) (active from 1995), American singer/songwriter
 Jordan Hill (basketball) (born 1987), American professional basketball player
 Jordan Hill (soccer) (born 1996), American soccer player
 Jordan Hill (ice hockey) (born 1989), Canadian ice hockey defenseman
 Jordan Hill (American football) (born 1991), American football defensive tackle
 Jordan Hill, Dorset, a hill in England
 Jordan Hill, Louisiana, a census-designated place in Winn Parish, Louisiana

See also 
 Jordan Hill Roman Temple, England
 Jordanhill, Glasgow, Scotland
 Hill (surname)
 

Hill, Jordan